Lycurgus of Sparta is a 1791 oil painting attributed to the French painter Jacques-Louis David which is in the collection of the Musée des Beaux-Arts, Blois, France.

Lycurgus was a quasi-legendary lawgiver of the state of Sparta in the Greek Peloponnese in the 8th century B.C. He was believed to be the younger son of a king of Sparta who became king himself when his elder brother died shortly after their father. His brother's wife was pregnant at the time and Lycurgus dutifully handed over the kingship to the child when it was born.

Spartan custom demanded that all new born babies were vetted by a council of elders at a Lesche, who ordered that any with disabilities were to be taken to die in the open on a mountainside at Apothetae. One interpretation of David's picture is that Lycurgus was standing in for his brother in showing the new born baby and future king to the council for their approval. Alternatively he is merely organising the screening process for a number of new-born babies.

References

1791 paintings
Paintings by Jacques-Louis David